"Leave Me Lonely" is a song by Australian hip hop group Hilltop Hoods from their eighth studio album The Great Expanse. It was released as the second single from the album on 23 November 2018.

At the ARIA Music Awards of 2019, the album was nominated for Song of the Year.

At the APRA Music Awards of 2020, the song won Most Performed Urban Work of the Year.

Chart performance
The song peaked at No. 11 on the ARIA Singles Chart, making it Hilltop Hoods' ninth top 40 single. The song was certified Platinum by ARIA in February 2019.

Charts

Weekly charts

Year-end charts

Certifications

References

2018 singles
2018 songs
APRA Award winners
Hilltop Hoods songs
Universal Music Australia singles